Bays are areas of water bordered by land on three sides.

Bays may also refer to:

Bays (surname)
Bays Precinct, an urban renewal project in Sydney, Australia
Baltimore Bays, a soccer team that played in the North American Soccer League
Baltimore Bays (1972-1973), a soccer team that played in the American Soccer League
Baltimore Bays (1993-1998), a soccer team that played in the United Soccer Leagues
Bays Precinct, in Sydney, Australia
East Coast Bays AFC, a soccer club in Auckland, New Zealand
Ferrymead Bays, a soccer club in Christchurch, New Zealand
Maryland Bays, an inaugural franchise of the third incarnation of the American Soccer League
The Bays (band), an English musical group
2nd Dragoon Guards (Queen's Bays), commonly known as the Bays

See also
Baize (disambiguation)
Bay (disambiguation)
Bays Mountain
Baze